Neckarbischofsheim is a town in the district of Rhein-Neckar-Kreis, in Baden-Württemberg,  Germany. It is situated 8 km northeast of Sinsheim, and 24 km southeast of Heidelberg.

Mayors
 1949–1974: Albert Kumpf
 1974–1990: Günter Burkhardt
 1990–2004: Rolf Geinert (SPD)
 2004–2012: Hans-Joachim Vogt
 2012–2020: Tanja Grether
since 2020: Thomas Seidelmann

Sons and daughters of the city 

  Karl Mayer (1786-1870), jurist and poet
 Louis Mayer (painter) (1791-1843), landscape painter
 Axel Schock (born 1965), journalist and author

Ludwig Jesselson (born 1910),
Philanthropist and Businessman

References

Rhein-Neckar-Kreis
Baden